On 20-22 March 2023, Xi Jinping. Chinese president and general secretary of the Chinese Communist Party, visited Russia, in his first international meeting since his re-election as president during the 2023 National People's Congress. He is scheduled to meet with Russian president Vladimir Putin. It is also the first international meeting of Vladimir Putin since the International Criminal Court issued a warrant for his arrest.

Background 
The visit comes just days after China won a major diplomatic victory, bringing Iran and Saudi Arabia closer together and restoring their diplomatic relations.

Hours after it was announced that Xi Jinping would visit Russia, the International Criminal Court issued a warrant to arrest Vladimir Putin.

Prior to the visit, Xi Jinping and Vladimir Putin published separate articles; Xi said China's proposal to end the Ukraine crisis reflected world opinion. Putin said he had high hopes for the visit of his "good old friend."

Visit 
On the morning of 20 March, Xi Jinping arrived at Vnukovo Airport, Moscow. On 21 March, he is scheduled to meet with Vladimir Putin.

During XI Jinping's visit Russian President Vladimir Putin said Russia is ready to discuss China’s initiative for ending the conflict in Ukraine, adding that he had looked at China’s proposals for a resolution of the Ukraine conflict and that he viewed them with respect.

See also
China during the Russo-Ukrainian War
List of international trips made by Xi Jinping
2023 visit by Joe Biden to Ukraine

References

2023 in international relations
2023 in Moscow
March 2023 events in China
March 2023 events in Russia
Russia
Vladimir Putin
China–Russia relations